Malaysia–Switzerland relations refers to bilateral foreign relations between the two countries, Malaysia and Switzerland. Malaysia has an embassy in Bern, and Switzerland has an embassy in Kuala Lumpur.

History 

In the 19th century, Swiss trading companies set up operations in Malaysia. Diplomatic relations were established in 1963.

Economic relations 
Switzerland maintains good contacts in the educational field and supports projects of the International Tropical Timber Organization (ITTO) for the sustainable management of tropical forests. Many Swiss companies has operating in Malaysia. Since 2011, there are currently 792 Swiss nationals who reside in Malaysia. Several agreements, such as avoidance on tax were also been signed. Many Swiss foods brand such as chocolates and yogurts has reach Malaysian markets and popular in the country.

References 

 
Switzerland
Bilateral relations of Switzerland